The 2012 United States House of Representatives elections in South Carolina were held on Tuesday, November 6, 2012 and elected the seven U.S. Representatives from the state of South Carolina, an increase of one seat as a result of reapportionment thanks to the continued strong growth found in South Carolina as reported in the 2010 United States Census. The elections coincided with the elections of other federal and state offices, including a quadrennial presidential election. The people of South Carolina elected six Republicans and one Democrat to represent the state in the 113th United States Congress.

Overview

Redistricting
On July 26, 2011, the South Carolina House of Representatives and Senate passed a compromise redistricting bill which would place the new 7th district in the Pee Dee region. The bill was signed into law by Governor Nikki Haley on August 1.

Under the 1965 Voting Rights Act, South Carolina's congressional redistricting had to be pre-cleared by the U.S. Department of Justice or the United States District Court for the District of Columbia before it could be enacted. The Department of Justice precleared the map in October 2011; a subsequent lawsuit brought by six voters for discrimination under the new lines was dismissed by the United States District Court for the District of South Carolina in March 2012.

District 1

In redistricting, the 1st district was moved south along the coast to include Hilton Head and parts of Charleston County, and is expected to remain favorable to Republicans. Republican Tim Scott, who has represented the 1st district since January 2011, sought re-election.

Republican primary

Candidates

Nominee
Tim Scott, incumbent U.S. Representative

Democratic primary

Candidates

Nominee
Bobbie Rose, former teacher and realtor

General election

Endorsements

Results

District 2

In redistricting, Hilton Head and its surrounding areas, and counties on the state's southern border were removed from the 2nd district, which now includes all of Aiken County. Republican Joe Wilson, who has represented the 2nd district since 2001, sought re-election.

Republican primary

Candidates

Nominee
Joe Wilson, incumbent U.S. Representative

Eliminated in primary
Phil Black, businessman and candidate for this seat in 2008 & 2010

Democratic primary
No candidate filed to run on the Democratic side.

Primary results

General election

Endorsements

Results

District 3

Redistricting added parts of Newberry and Greenville counties to the 3rd district; parts of Aiken County were removed. The district was expected to continue to favor Republicans. Republican Jeff Duncan, who has represented the 3rd district since January 2011, sought re-election.

Republican primary

Candidates

Nominee
Jeff Duncan, incumbent U.S. Representative

Democratic primary

Candidates

Nominee
Brian Doyle, radio talk show host

Eliminated in primary
Cason Gaither, former field Organizer for Vincent Sheheen's gubernatorial campaign in 2010

Primary results

General election

Endorsements

Results

District 4

The redrawn 4th district maintains a balance between Greenville and Spartanburg counties, and is expected to continue to favor Republicans. Republican Trey Gowdy, who has represented the 4th district since January 2011, sought re-election.
Greenville artist Jeff Sumerel is the nominee of the South Carolina Green Party.

Republican primary

Candidates

Nominee
Trey Gowdy, incumbent U.S. Representative

Democratic primary

Candidates

Nominee
Deb Morrow, retired computer system designer

Eliminated in primary
Jimmy Tobias, businessman

Primary results

General election

Endorsements

Results

District 5

The 5th district, which extends from the North Carolina border to the outskirts of Sumter, was made more favorable to Republicans in redistricting. Republican Mick Mulvaney, who has represented the 5th district since January 2011, sought re-election.

Republican primary

Candidates

Nominee
Mick Mulvaney, incumbent U.S. Representative

Democratic primary

Candidates

Nominee
Joyce Knott, businesswoman

General election

Endorsements

Results

District 6

The 6th district is expected to continue to strongly favor Democrats. Democrat Jim Clyburn, the Assistant Democratic Leader of the U.S. House who has represented the 6th district since 1993, faced Green Party nominee Nammu Muhammad.

Democratic primary

Candidates

Nominee
Jim Clyburn, incumbent U.S. Representative

General election

Endorsements

Results

District 7

The new 7th district will represent most of the Pee Dee region, including Chesterfield, Darlington, Dillon, Georgetown, Horry, Marion, and Marlboro counties, along with a part of Florence County, and is expected to favor Republicans.

Democratic primary

Candidates

Nominee
Gloria Bromell Tinubu, professor at Coastal Carolina University and former member of the Georgia state representative

Eliminated in primary
Preston Brittain, attorney 
Parnell Diggs, attorney and president of the National Federation of the Blind of South Carolina 
Harry Pavilack, attorney

Withdrawn
Ted Vick, South Carolina House of Representatives' minority whip

Declined
Stephen Wukela, mayor of Florence

Campaign
Ted Vick was considered to be the frontrunner until he was arrested in Columbia on the night of the May 14 on the Statehouse grounds and was charged with driving under the influence, speeding, and carrying a handgun without a permit. An officer had seen Vick stumbling as he walked into a parking garage, before getting into his car and hitting a cone before the officer could catch up. Vick smelled of alcohol but refused to take a breathalyzer test. Columbia Police Department officials indicated that Vick had been at a local bar prior to his arrest. A 21-year-old female USC student was in the car with Vick.

Vick would drop out of the race 10 days after his arrest.

Endorsements

Polling

Primary results

Runoff results

Republican primary

Candidates

Nominee
Tom Rice, chairman of the Horry County Council

Eliminated in primary
André Bauer, former lieutenant governor and candidate for Governor in 2010 
Renée Culler, realtor 
Katherine Jenerette, Army veteran and candidate for South Carolina's 1st congressional district in 2010 
Jay Jordan, attorney 
Jim Mader, businessman 
Chad Prosser, former director of South Carolina Parks, Recreation and Tourism 
Randal Wallace, Myrtle Beach city council-member 
Dick Withington, businessman and Democratic candidate for South Carolina's 1st congressional district in 2010

Withdrew
Thad Viers, state representative 
Debbie Harwell, public relations firm owner
Mande Wilkes, attorney and local television host

Declined
Alan Clemmons, state representative

Primary results

Runoff results

General election

Endorsements

Polling

Results

References

External links
South Carolina State Election Commission
United States House of Representatives elections in South Carolina, 2012 at Ballotpedia
South Carolina U.S. House at OurCampaigns.com
Campaign contributions for U.S. Congressional races in South Carolina from OpenSecrets
Outside spending at the Sunlight Foundation

2012
South Carolina
United States House of Representatives